The uneven bars at the European Women's Artistic Gymnastics Championships were first held in 1957.

Three medals are awarded: gold for first place, silver for second place, and bronze for third place. Tie breakers have not been used in every year. In the event of a tie between two gymnasts, both names are listed, and the following position (second for a tie for first, third for a tie for second) is left empty because a medal was not awarded for that position. If three gymnastics tied for a position, the following two positions are left empty.

Svetlana Khorkina holds the record for most gold medals in this event, with six. Khorkina and Beth Tweddle, who won four golds, one silver, and one bronze, are tied for most total medals.

Medalists

Medal table

References 

European Artistic Gymnastics Championships